Oat Mountain is a peak of the Santa Susana Mountains overlooking the San Fernando Valley (near Los Angeles, California) to the south and southeast. Oat Mountain is the highest peak in the Santa Susana Mountains of California. The Los Angeles district of Chatsworth is to the south of the mountain. There are many microwave relay antennas as well as Doppler weather equipment at Oat Mountain. SoCal Gas has several wells in the area as well.

Climate
The weather on Oat Mountain varies from season to season. In January, occasional rain showers and thunderstorms may pass over the mountain. Colder storms produce light snow on the peaks of the mountain, when the snow level drops below 4,000 feet. In spring, the weather may change. Some years it may be very dry, affecting the vegetation. In other years, spring could bring heavy storms with upwards of 4" of rain and some snow. The summer is dry, with occasional thunderstorms (brought in by sub-tropical moisture in the Pacific Ocean) from the floors of the San Fernando Valley and Santa Clarita Valley. This may bring flash flooding and debris flows from burn scars in the area. Fall is typically dry and sunny, and Santa Ana Winds can cause small wildfires to spread on the mountain.

Flora and fauna
Wildlife in the area is very sparse in summer months (though occasionally a bear can be spotted). Oat Mountain has typically the same type of flora and fauna found elsewhere in the mountain range. Mountain lions are particularly common in the region and can be seen almost year round, along with birds like the turkey vulture and the Canada goose.

Vegetation is not very diverse on the mountain. The mountain is usually covered in brown grass and oats in the summer, but during heavy periods of rain it is usually green and contains more wildlife.

Human interference
Oat Mountain has had many major problems in modern times, starting with the construction of two Cold War-era SAM-A-7 (Surface-to-Air Missile, Army, design 7, later changed to MIM-3 (Mobile Interceptor Missile, design 3) Nike Ajax and SAM-A-25/MIM-14 Nike Hercules anti-aircraft missile sites. Known as Nike Missile Site LA-88, they were there not so much to protect the civilian population of the San Fernando Valley, but to guard important military and industrial facilities like the Santa Susana Field Lab, from Soviet attack. They were in operation from 1956-1974. Since then, it was heavily contaminated and debris and abandoned buildings litter that area, located on Browns Canyon Road below Oat Mountain.

In 2015, a story made headlines when a gas leak was reported at one of the seven oil fields littering the natural areas of the mountain. The Aliso Canyon Oil Field was involved in this situation. Many people reported nose bleeds, strong headaches, and other symptoms. That same year the oil field was shut down and taken to court. As of August 2017, the oil field is scheduled to reopen but may be taken to the city regional court in Los Angeles or to the federal court in Sacramento.

Hiking and destinations
Oat Mountain has many hiking trails and scenic destinations. One of the main hiking trails ascends the San Fernando Valley side of the mountain and has four different connecting trails. One of these leads to the Nike Missile Site LA-88 with abandoned buildings, vehicles, and rubble surrounding it. One expert route up the mountain follows the backbone of the mountain in Santa Clarita but is difficult because it is forested. This is a 16-mile hike between Rocky Peak and Oat Mountain.

See also 
 Aliso Canyon Oil Field
 Chatsworth Peak
 Mission Point
 Rocky Peak
 Sand Rock Peak
Porter Ranch, California

References 

Santa Susana Mountains
Geography of the San Fernando Valley
Mountains of Los Angeles County, California
Mountains of Southern California